Heaven Without People) is the debut feature-length film written and directed by Lucien Bourjeily. It premiered in the main Muhr Awards competition section of the 14th Dubai International Film Festival and won the Special Jury Prize award. It went on to win the Global Vision Award at the 2018 Cinequest Film Festival and both the "Special Jury Prize" and "Ensemble Cast" award at the Festival des cinémas arabes à Paris. Furthermore, it competed in many international film festivals and was nominated for the Jordan Ressler award at the 2018 Miami International Film Festival, the Critics' Choice Award at the 2018 Hamburg Film Festival and the Best World Fiction film award at the 2018 LA Film Festival.

Synopsis
"When a large family comes together for the first time in two years over Easter lunch, tensions bubble to the surface in surprising ways as they navigate an unforeseen conflict that threatens to derail their reunion. Older and younger generations clash as each of the family members confront their own political and moral hypocrisies and slowly unravel the ties that bind."

Cast
 Samira Sarkis as Josephine (Aka Joujou)
 Wissam Botrous as Antoine (Her husband)
 Nadim Abou Samra as Serge 
 Laeticia Semaan as Leila
 Farah Shaer as Rita 
 Jenny Gebara as Noha (Josephine's sister)
 Ghassan Chemali as Rabih
 Nancy Karam as Christine
 Jean Paul Hage as Elias
 Hussein Hijazi as Gaby
 Toni Habib as Sami (Noha's son)
 Etafer Aweke as Zoufan
 Mohamad Abbas as Nabil (Gaby's friend)
 Ivy Helou as Yara (Elias and Christine's daughter)

Awards

References

External links
 
 

2017 films
2017 comedy-drama films
Lebanese comedy-drama films
2010s Arabic-language films